tsclient (Terminal Server Client) is a discontinued  frontend for rdesktop and other remote desktop tools, which allow remotely controlling one computer from another. It is a GNOME application. Notable visual options include color depth, screen size, and motion blocking.

Features include: a GNOME panel applet to quickly launch saved profiles, sound support, similar look and functionality to the Microsoft client and compatibility with its file format, interface translated into more than 20 languages, and support for rdesktop 1.3, Xnest and VNC clients (*vncviewer).

Versions 
There are two different versions in use.

 Version 0.150 has an advanced user interface with many options.
 The unstable (development) version 2.0.1 is the version used by Red Hat Linux/Fedora. This version is not that advanced, as it is a complete rewrite. From the Release Notes of Version 0.150: "I hope this version is the last before a completely rewrite."

There is not much documentation about the tool. It is seemingly developed by a single person. (Only one person, James Willcox, is listed in the AUTHORS file of the new version.) In the credits pane found within version 0.150, there are four authors listed (Erick Woods, Kyle Davis, Jonh Wendell, Benoit Poulet).

There is also a build available for Mac OS X.

See also 
 Comparison of remote desktop software
 Vinagre

References

External links
 Tsclient on sourceforge
 Tsclient at OpenSUSE build service

Free network-related software
Free software programmed in C
Remote desktop software that uses GTK